Lucius is a Latin praenomen, or personal name, which was one of the most common names throughout Roman history. The feminine form is Lucia. The praenomen was used by both patrician and plebeian families, and gave rise to the patronymic gentes Lucia and Lucilia, as well as the cognomen Lucullus. It was regularly abbreviated L.

Throughout Roman history, Lucius was the most common praenomen, used slightly more than Gaius and somewhat more than Marcus. Although a number of prominent families rarely or never used it, it was amongst the most frequently given names in countless others. The name survived the collapse of the Western Empire in the 5th century, and has continued into modern times.

Origin and meaning
In De Praenominibus (Concerning Praenomina), Julius Paris asserts that Lucius is derived from lux, light, and that the name was originally given to children who were born at dawn. This meaning alone would not be enough to account for the frequency with which the name was used, but as with all praenomina, parents were free to choose the name which most appealed to them, and once a praenomen became regularly used in any family, it tended to be passed down from one generation to the next, by the strength of tradition.

Chase connects the name with the archaic adjective , which meant bright or shining, although by the classical period it had come to refer to a cleared grove. He points out the Greek cognate, leukos, from which the personal name Lucas or Luke is derived.

The Etruscan form of this praenomen is Lucie.

References 

Ancient Roman praenomina